Xinzhu station is an overground metro station on Line 3 of the Xi'an Metro. It began operations on 8 November 2016.

References

Railway stations in Shaanxi
Railway stations in China opened in 2016
Xi'an Metro stations